Óscar Rodríguez Antequera (born 17 April 1980) is a Spanish former professional footballer who played as a central defender.

Club career

Spain
Born in Seville, Andalusia, Rodríguez graduated from local Sevilla FC's youth system, making his senior debut with the B-team in 1999. His first appearance in La Liga occurred on 1 September 2002, as he played the full 90 minutes in a 0–1 home loss against RC Celta de Vigo; 17 of his league games for the main squad took place during that season, with the team eventually ranking in tenth position.

From August–December 2004, Rodríguez was loaned to Real Valladolid of Segunda División. Released by his parent club in June of the following year, he resumed his career with another side in the second tier, Polideportivo Ejido, then moved to the lower leagues with FC Cartagena.

Rodríguez signed for Écija Balompié in the summer of 2008, being eventually named team captain and renewing his contract for a further two years on 15 July 2011. On 18 July 2014, he announced his intentions to leave.

Abroad
On 8 September 2013, after claiming he had received offers from clubs in Thailand and Italy, the 33-year-old Rodríguez signed for Paniliakos F.C. in the Football League (Greece). The following year he switched teams and countries, joining Hong Kong First Division League's Hong Kong Rangers FC.

References

External links

HKFA profile

1980 births
Living people
Footballers from Seville
Spanish footballers
Association football defenders
La Liga players
Segunda División players
Segunda División B players
Tercera División players
Sevilla Atlético players
Sevilla FC players
Real Valladolid players
Polideportivo Ejido footballers
FC Cartagena footballers
Écija Balompié players
Football League (Greece) players
Paniliakos F.C. players
Hong Kong First Division League players
Hong Kong Rangers FC players
Spanish expatriate footballers
Expatriate footballers in Greece
Expatriate footballers in Hong Kong
Spanish expatriate sportspeople in Greece
Spanish expatriate sportspeople in Hong Kong